Arichat is an unincorporated place in the Municipality of the County of Richmond, Nova Scotia, Canada. It is the main village on Isle Madame on the southeastern tip of Cape Breton Island.

Toponym 
The name derives from a Mi'kmaq word meaning camping ground, or worn rocks.

History 
Arichat has a deep and protected natural harbour which made it an important fishing and shipbuilding centre in the 1800s.

Jerseyman Island, which protects the harbour, was visited by Europeans fishermen as early as the 1500s.

The village was sacked by John Paul Jones during the American Revolutionary War, after which two cannons were installed above the village.

The LeNoir Forge was an important boat building site and is now a museum.

The first classes of St. Francis Xavier University began at Arichat in 1853, later moving to Antigonish.

The Catholic Cathedral of Notre Dame de l'Assomption was constructed in 1835, having since been rebuilt. It is the oldest surviving Roman Catholic Church in Nova Scotia.

St. John's Anglican Church was built in 1828, destroyed by fire and rebuilt in 1895. Considered to be the second oldest Anglican congregation in Cape Breton, the Church is noted for its amazing acoustic properties, a signature of its architect.

Lighthouses were built in the 1850s, since replaced with replicas in 2017-2018.

In 1970,  struck Cerberus Rock, releasing over 10,000 tons of oil, devastating the fishing industry. It is now a popular dive site.

Gallery

References 

Communities in Richmond County, Nova Scotia
1785 establishments in Nova Scotia
Populated coastal places in Canada